King of the Jungle is a 1933 American pre-Code adventure film directed by H. Bruce Humberstone and Max Marcin and written by Charles Thurley Stoneham, Max Marcin, Fred Niblo, Jr. and Philip Wylie. The film stars Buster Crabbe, Frances Dee, Sidney Toler, Nydia Westman, Robert Barrat, Irving Pichel and Douglass Dumbrille. The film was released on March 10, 1933, by Paramount Pictures.

Cast

Buster Crabbe as Kaspa the Lion Man
Frances Dee as Ann Rogers
Sidney Toler as Neil Forbes
Nydia Westman as Sue
Robert Barrat as Joe Nolan
Irving Pichel as Corey
Douglass Dumbrille as Ed Peters
Sam Baker as Gwana
Patricia Farley as Kitty
Ronnie Cosbey as Kaspa (aged 3)

References

External links
 

1933 films
1930s English-language films
American adventure films
1933 adventure films
Paramount Pictures films
Films directed by H. Bruce Humberstone
American black-and-white films
Films with screenplays by Philip Wylie
1930s American films